Sang-e-Masha, also spelled Sange-e-Masha or Sangi Masha, is the administrative center of Jaghori District in Ghazni Province of Afghanistan.

See also 
 Jaghori District
 Ghazni Province

References 

Jaghori District
Populated places in Ghazni Province
Ghazni Province
Hazarajat